Duilio Del Prete (25 June 1938 – 2 February 1998) was an Italian actor, dubber and singer-songwriter.
Del Prete was born at Cuneo, Piedmont. As a singer-songwriter, he wrote political songs and recorded an album of Jacques Brel's covers; he also wrote songs for several artists.

As an actor, he participated to several films of the commedia all'italiana, including My Friends and Alfredo, Alfredo, both by Pietro Germi, and Sessomatto. He also played in several foreign films, including two for director Peter Bogdanovich, Daisy Miller (1974) and At Long Last Love (1975).

Del Prete died in Rome of cancer in 1998.

Filmography

 The Seven Cervi Brothers (1968) as Dante Castellucci
 Commandos (1968) as Bruno
 Tribuna Padronale (1971) as palazzinaro immaginario
 The Assassination of Trotsky (1972) as Felipe
 Alfredo Alfredo (1972) as Oreste
 Il caso Pisciotta (1972) as Agent Sciurti
 D'amore si muore (1972)
 The Nun and the Devil (1973) as Pietro
 Redneck (1973) as Captain Lenzi
 We Want the Colonels (1973) as Monsignor Giampaolino Sartorello
 Number One (1973) 
 High Crime (1973) as Umberto Griva
 Massacre in Rome (1973) as Partisan
 How Funny Can Sex Be? (1973) as Vittorio ("L'ospite")
 The Devil Is a Woman (1973) as Monsignor Salvi
 Daisy Miller (1974) as Mr. Giovanelli
 Pianeta Venere (1974)
 At Long Last Love (1975) as Johnny Spanish
 My Friends (1975) as Guido Necchi
 The Divine Nymph (1975) as Armellini
 The Sensuous Nurse (1975) as Benito Varotto
 L'Italia s'è rotta (1976) as Il censore
 Stato interessante (1977) as Federico (first story)
 A Spiral of Mist (1977) as Marcello Testa
 Io zombo, tu zombi, lei zomba (1979) as zombie
 Nella misura in cui... (1979)
 L'imbranato (1979) as Maranotti
 Augh! Augh! (1980) as Conte Giorgio Corsini
 On n'est pas des anges... elles non-plus (1981) as Vittorio
 Le Cadeau (Le cadeau) (1982) as Umberto
 Dagger Eyes (1983) as Captain Levi
 Cronaca nera (1987, TV Movie) as Carlo Gironda
 Days of Inspector Ambrosio  (1988) as Francesco Borghi
 Ti ho incontrata domani (1989) as L'amico di Primo
 A proposito di quella strana ragazza (1989) as Giovanna's father
 Panama Sugar (1990) as Blue Ball 
 Voices from Beyond (1991) as Giorgio Mainardi
 Mi manca Marcella (1992) as Conrado
 Altrove (1995) as Commissario Tirelli
 Auguri professore (1997) as the headmaster (final film role)

Notes

External links
 
 

1938 births
1998 deaths
People from Cuneo
Italian male film actors
Italian male singer-songwriters
Deaths from cancer in Lazio
20th-century Italian male actors
20th-century Italian male singers